Titti may refer to:

Titti (bagpipe), a bagpipe found in Andhra Pradesh, India
Titty (disambiguation), various meanings, most popularly a synonym for female breasts
Titti is also a given name. People with the name include:
Titti Maartmann, a Norwegian luge athlete
Titti Qvarnström, a Swedish chef

See also

 Titi (disambiguation)